

2000 Nandi Awards Winners List

References

2000
2000 Indian film awards